Tuia 250 was a government-sponsored commemoration for the 250th anniversary of the arrival of Captain Cook on the HMS Endeavour in Aotearoa (now New Zealand) in 1769–1770. Highlights of the event were a fleet of Polynesian double-hulled waka and tallships retracing Cook's route and the British High Commissioner delivering an 'expression of regret' to local iwi over the killings of the indigenous Māori people by Cook and his crew.

Some iwi and individuals actively participated in Tuia 250, significant numbers boycotted  or otherwise criticised it.

See also
Sesqui 1990

References

2019 in New Zealand
Race relations in New Zealand
2020 in New Zealand
Regional centennial anniversaries